Sir William Hall-Jones  (16 January 1851 – 19 June 1936) was the 16th prime minister of New Zealand from June 1906 until August 1906.

Hall-Jones entered parliament in 1890, later becoming a member of the Liberal Party. He was interim prime minister from the death of Richard Seddon to the return from overseas of Joseph Ward. Hall-Jones was a mild mannered man with a fully earned reputation as an outstanding administrator. Seddon famously said of him, "He is the best administrator I have in my Cabinet."

From 1908 to 1912, Hall-Jones was New Zealand's High Commissioner to the United Kingdom.

Early years
Hall-Jones was born in Folkestone, Kent, England, and landed at Dunedin in 1873. He became a carpenter and later a builder in Timaru. He developed an interest in local politics serving on the Timaru Borough Council from 1884 to 1886, and again from 1890 to 1892.

Member of Parliament

The death of Richard Turnbull triggered a by-election in the Timaru electorate, which was won by Hall-Jones on 18 August 1890. Hall-Jones had initially refused nomination from locals, citing several upcoming business contracts. However, after persistent calls, Hall-Jones reluctantly accepted despite having no parliamentary ambitions. He represented Timaru in the House of Representatives until his resignation in October 1908.

Hall-Jones proved an independent thinker. He was initially an Independent Liberal holding moderate, progressive views that tended to align him with John Ballance, Sir George Grey and John McKenzie. He joined the Liberal caucus and in 1891 became the party whip alongside Westby Perceval.

Cabinet minister
Hall-Jones became a cabinet minister in March 1896 and was given the Public Works portfolio by the prime minister, Richard Seddon following William Pember Reeves resignation to become Agent General for New Zealand in the United Kingdom. His main task in this role was improving the main trunk rail line between Auckland and Wellington. Rejecting a proposal for another incline on the Rimutaka ranges he insisted on using a better route, resulting in the Raurimu Spiral. He was also responsible for the eventual construction of the Otira tunnel, going through Arthur's Pass.

Several weeks after entering cabinet, Hall-Jones was also appointed minister of marine, a post which he was to hold for over a decade. Hall-Jones was also responsible for passing a bill granting protection to the famous navigation dolphin Pelorus Jack by Order in Council under the Sea Fisheries Act on 26 September 1904.

Prime Minister
Hall-Jones was acting prime minister during the absence from the country of Seddon in 1906 and formed an administration immediately after Seddon's funeral. During his brief period as prime minister, he was colonial treasurer, minister of labour, minister of education, minister for public works and minister of marine.

However, Hall-Jones announced that he would only hold power until Sir Joseph Ward's return from abroad. Despite this, there was much speculation in the media that he might attempt to remain in office as Seddon himself had done in 1893.

Later career
Hall-Jones accepted the Railways and Public Works portfolios in the subsequent Ward administration. Later, he succeeded William Pember Reeves as High Commissioner for New Zealand in London in December 1908, returned to New Zealand at the end of his term in 1912, and was appointed to the Legislative Council by Massey.

Hall-Jones died at his home in Wellington on 19 June 1936.

See also
 Liberal Government of New Zealand

Notes

References

The Bateman New Zealand Encyclopedia, 1988

External links 

 Prime Ministers Office Biography: William Hall-Jones

|-

|-

|-

|-

|-

|-

1851 births
1936 deaths
English emigrants to New Zealand
Local politicians in New Zealand
Members of the Cabinet of New Zealand
New Zealand education ministers
Members of the New Zealand House of Representatives
Members of the New Zealand Legislative Council
New Zealand finance ministers
New Zealand Knights Commander of the Order of St Michael and St George
New Zealand Liberal Party MPs
Leaders of political parties in New Zealand
People from Folkestone
Prime Ministers of New Zealand
People from Timaru
New Zealand Liberal Party MLCs
High Commissioners of New Zealand to the United Kingdom
New Zealand MPs for South Island electorates
19th-century New Zealand politicians
New Zealand politicians awarded knighthoods
Justice ministers of New Zealand